Aktaş is a village in the District of Şereflikoçhisar, Ankara Province, Turkey. The village is populated by Kurds. Aktaş is the home village of Kurdish politician Murat Bozlak.

References

Villages in Şereflikoçhisar District

Kurdish settlements in Ankara Province